Roberta Panara (born 12 January 1984) is an Italian swimmer who competed in the 2008 Summer Olympics.

References

1984 births
Living people
Italian female swimmers
Italian female breaststroke swimmers
Olympic swimmers of Italy
Swimmers at the 2008 Summer Olympics
Mediterranean Games gold medalists for Italy
Mediterranean Games medalists in swimming
Swimmers at the 2001 Mediterranean Games
21st-century Italian women